The Rio Hondo Bike Path is a bicycle path that parallels the Rio Hondo (creek) through the San Gabriel Valley, in eastern Los Angeles County, California.   The path is gently graded, and has sections with more greenery and mature trees than other bicycle paths in the area. Rio Hondo means deep river in Spanish.

The proximity of the Rio Hondo Bike Path to the major regional transit hub at the El Monte Station, including the MetroLink Silver Line, makes it one of easiest routes to access a variety of bike paths and local parks.

Route
The northern start of the Rio Hondo Bike Path is at the Peck Road Water Conservation Park in the southern Monrovia area.

From there the southbound path follows along a rural stream bed through the Whittier Narrows Recreation Area. One can connect to the San Gabriel River bicycle path via the Legg Lake bicycle path here.   The Rio Hondo bike path continues south and joins Los Angeles River bicycle path at the confluence of the Rio Hondo and Los Angeles River in South Gate. The L.A. River bike path continues to downtown Long Beach, ending by the Pacific Ocean.

References

External links

Bike Paths — Rio Hondo bicycle path

Bike paths in Los Angeles
San Gabriel Valley
Parks in Los Angeles County, California